Viktor Gluth (May 6, 1852 in Pilsen – January 17, 1917) was a Bohemian-German composer.  He was professor at the Königliche Akademie der Tonkunst (Royal Academy of Music) in Munich.

Compositions
 Der Trentajäger [Zlatorog], with Rudolf Baumbach (Munich, 1885; rewritten Munich, 1911)
 Horand und Hilde, with Rudolf Baumbach (Munich, 1914)
 Et Resurrexit

References

1852 births
1917 deaths
Musicians from Munich
German composers
19th-century German musicians